November is an album by jazz guitarist John Abercrombie with saxophonist John Surman,  bassist Marc Johnson, and drummer Peter Erskine that was recorded in 1992 and released by ECM in 1993.

Reception 
The Allmusic review by Thom Jurek gave the album 3 stars, stating, "It's a solid session from beginning to end, but one still wishes Eicher would take his hands off the sound controls a bit, allowing some of the rawness that each of these players shows in live settings to enter the studio". The Penguin Guide to Jazz gave the album 4 stars, stating, "Reconvening the trio with Johnson and Erskine was a masterstroke. Teaming them with stablemate Surman was little short of genius... Superb, evocative modern jazz".

Track listing
All compositions by John Abercrombie except as indicated

 "The Cat's Back" (Abercrombie, Erskine, Johnson, Surman) – 6:24
 "J.S." – 6:14
 "Right Brain Patrol" (Johnson) – 9:00
 "Prelude" – 3:27
 "November" (Abercrombie, Erskine, Johnson) – 8:26
 "Rise and Fall" (Erskine) – 5:22
 "John's Waltz" – 5:40
 "Ogeda" (Surman) – 4:40
 "Tuesday Afternoon" (Erskine, Johnson) – 2:55
 "To Be" – 5:24
 "Come Rain or Come Shine" (Harold Arlen, Johnny Mercer) – 6:04
 "Big Music" – 5:41

Personnel
 John Abercrombie – guitar
 John Surman – soprano saxophone, baritone saxophone, bass clarinet
 Marc Johnson – double bass
 Peter Erskine – drums

References

ECM Records albums
John Abercrombie (guitarist) albums
1992 albums
Albums produced by Manfred Eicher